River Forest Township is one of 29 townships in Cook County, Illinois. The population was 11,172 at the 2010 census. River Forest Township is coterminous with the Village of River Forest. It is one of four coterminous townships in Cook County and one of seventeen coterminous townships statewide. Like the village, the township is bounded by Harlem Avenue, North Avenue, Madison Avenue to Lathrop Avenue, to Central Avenue and back to Harlem.

History
The village incorporated in 1880 as part of Proviso Township. Miss Thatcher, a resident at that time, said, "The Village of River Forest was incorporated as a matter of necessity to defeat the saloonkeepers' project to organize and open a liquor sales district, and destroy our village." However, later that year, the village trustees licensed two saloons in the east part of the village to raise funds for running the government.

In 1917, the board of education petitioned the village to create a separate township in an effort to increase revenue to fund growing educational requirements. Cost savings were anticipated by avoiding the duplication of certain village and township officers. Taxes for township roads and bridges were eliminated. The plan also made funds raised by taxation immediately available to the community to support community interests. Finally, it was thought that an in-town assessor would provide a more equitable tax assessment. This separation was approved by citizens via a postcard referendum vote held on April 17, 1917.

References

External links 
 
City-data.com
Cook County Official Site

Townships in Cook County, Illinois
Townships in Illinois
1917 establishments in Illinois